Joy of Satan Ministries, also referred to as Joy of Satan (JoS), is a website and western esoteric occult organization founded in 2002 by Andrea M. Dietrich  ( Maxine Dietrich). Joy of Satan Ministries advocates "Spiritual Satanism", an ideology that presents a synthesis of Theistic Satanism, Nazism, Gnostic Paganism, Western esotericism, UFO conspiracy theories and extraterrestrial beliefs similar to those popularized by Zecharia Sitchin and David Icke.

Members believe Satan to be "The true father and creator God of humanity", whose desire was for his creations, humanity, to elevate themselves through knowledge and understanding.

They have been the topic of significant controversy for their anti-Semitic beliefs and a connection to a former chairman of the National Socialist Movement, an American Neo-Nazi organization.

Definition 
The orientation of the Joy of Satan Ministries – "Spiritual Satanism" – is generally acknowledged by some scholars as a form of western esotericism, embracing an esoteric form of LaVeyan Satanism instead of the materialist and carnal inceptions idealized by Anton LaVey. Their relation between Satan is described by professor of religious studies, Christopher Partridge, as "the core of an esoteric project of transformation, based on a personal or mystical relationship".

History
In the early 2000s, Maxine Dietrich began the creation of Joy of Satan Ministries. Maxine Dietrich established a Satanic ideology that would present itself as an esoteric form of LaVeyan Satanism, but would espouse a "traditional Satanism" by establishing its satanic fundamentals from ancient Middle East, Far-Eastern and Western teachings, and only acknowledging Judaic/Abrahamic concepts of Satan as a reaction. From the research of Zechariah Sitchin, Maxine Dietrich derived the theory of an ancient conflict between advanced extraterrestrial races (see #Origins of humanity, below) and incorporated these theories into her ideology; she concluded that Jews and the Abrahamic religions were the products of a hostile alien race responsible for the deposition of pagan religions and their pagan gods (who the JoS identify as demons). With this reinterpretation, the Joy of Satan recreated Anton LaVey's Sigil of Baphomet, a Sigil that would incorporate Cuneiform script instead of Hebrew letters (which spells out "Satan" in cuneiform instead of "Leviathan" in Hebrew), attributing to the earlier uses of the Pentagram in Sumeria. These incorporated theories, in addition to its contempt of Jewish mysticism, became the spark of significant controversy for the religious organization.

When the adoption of anti-Judaic sentiment had completely established itself within the JoS ideology, further anti-Semitic theories would later be incorporated. In 2004, it was also revealed that Clifford Herrington, chairman of the National Socialist Movement, was the husband of the high priestess of the organization. This revelation exposed the split in the NSM's religious orientation, leading to significant disputes and conflicts among members within the NSM and JoS. 

Despite the events, Joy of Satan continued to persist from the early 21st century and maintained some degree of popularity and significance among the currents of recent and contemporary theistic Satanism. The Joy of Satan Ministries became established as a non-profit religious organization in 2004.

On June 30, 2006, Andrea and Clifford Herrington were allegedly the target of an attempted car bombing. After noticing wires hanging out from under the car, the Tulsa bomb squad was called out to a Walmart supercenter to remove the explosive device. The incident was reported by newspaper company 'Tulsa World', subsequently all articles were removed from the website.

Beliefs

Extraterrestrials
Joy of Satan presents various extraterrestrial theories, some of which they derive from author of ancient astronauts, Zecharia Sitchin. JoS believe that Satan and the Demons of the Goetia are sentient and powerful extraterrestrial beings responsible for the creation of humanity, and whose origins pre-date Abrahamic religions. They're also identified as Nephilim from the Hebrew bible. According to sociologist of religion Massimo Introvigne, "Maxine Dietrich derived from these theories the ideas of a mortal struggle between enlightened aliens and a monstrous extra-terrestrial race, the Reptilians."

Origins of humanity 
Joy of Satan Ministries believe that one of the benign aliens, Enki, which they consider to be Satan himself, created with his collaborators on Earth human beings through their advanced technology of genetic engineering. It's considered by Joy of Satan that most salient of his creations were the Nordic-Aryan race. They declare that the Reptilians have, in turn, created their own kind by combining their own DNA with the DNA of semi-animal humanoids with the result identified as the Jewish race.

Joy of Satan Ministries theorize that after the benevolent extraterrestrials left Earth 10,000 years ago, the agents of the Reptilians created their own religions, the Abrahamic religions, which subsequently began the deposition and defamation of Pagan deities. They claim these religions maligned the benign extraterrestrials by labeling them as "devils", and through their doctrines, created a climate of terror within humanity (e.g. condemning sexuality), in order to better program and control humans. They state that Satan, however, did not abandon humanity, believing he has revealed himself in The Black Book of Satan (not to be confused with the ONA's scripture of the same name).

Theology
Adherents of Joy of Satan Ministries are generally polytheists, viewing demons of the Goetia to have a literal existence and Satan to be their cardinal ruler. Satan and some demons are also viewed as one of many deities and are equated with many gods from ancient cultures, such as Satan having known to be the Sumerian god Enki and the Yazidi angel Melek Taus. While Satan is considered a deity within JoS, the deities themselves are understood to be highly evolved, un-aging, sentient and powerful humanoid extraterrestrial beings.

While the Joy of Satan Ministries adopts the Satanic fundamentals of LaVey's Satanic bible, Introvigne describes LaVeyan Satanism as more "rationalist" in comparison. In Asbjorn Dyrendal's account, he acknowledges "a different spiritual atmosphere from LaVeyan Satanism." Asbjorn states that "LaVey was able to suggest the reality of mysterious, 'occult' forces' while simultaneously appealing to an atheist viewpoint that, he asserted, was supported by modern science." He further adds that "The Joy of Satan tends to present with more simple, spiritualized language."

Satan is seen as an important deity by the Joy of Satan, although not as an omnipotent and omnipresent god. They also hold the belief of Satan to be a representative of the notions of strength, power, justice, and freedom. Lillith is another deity of significance to the group, who is recognized as "the patron of strong women and a Goddess of women's rights", as well as abortion rights and birth control.

Practices
Joy of Satan promotes a wide variety of occult practices, such as methods for evocation of demonic entities and guidelines for making pacts with them. JoS consider that Satanism, in practice, is the true nature of humanity that precedes Christianity.

Occultism
Practitioners of the Joy of Satan Ministries may share similar practices of other groups under the theistic Satanist sect and those categorized in the esoteric ideology. According to Christian author and biblical researcher, Josh Peck, "theistic Satanism engages in every New age practice under the sun in their dedications to Satan and Satanic philosophy." Referring the spiritual ministry as an example, he notes their divination methods in astrology, magic, pendulums, runes, clairvoyance, past lives, the pineal gland and third eye, the chakras, bioelectric technology, the astral plane, spells, the kundalini serpent, trance, as well as methods in self-hypnosis, incense, telekinesis, brain waves, and chanting.

Jesper Petersen states that practitioners experimenting with the meditation practices of the JoS can find them useful. Their numerous uses of magic also run from simple to the complex. These include sorcery, spells, and various types of witchcraft, all of which require the practitioner to imaginatively apply specialized knowledge and technique to the object of the spell, hypnotism, healing and other kind of magic or divination. They also offer a range of occult techniques in black magic.

Rituals
According to Jesper Petersen, "The rituals proposed by the Joy of Satan are very simple and not particularly advanced, with most consisting of mainly visualization exercises rather than actual rituals known in mainstream satanic culture. Despite what's commonly believed, the process of their rituals is not a negotiation or 'exercises of evil, but rather 'telepathic communication' with anthropomorphic beings, with an almost jovial tone throughout various rituals". The JoS also state Satan recognizes a lack of funds and does not expect his adherents to have expensive items for ritual in comparison to the ideals of a modern Christian Church. A similar formulation is also used when discussing the scarcity of black candles.

Initiates begin a "formal commitment" that is signed in blood and burned in order to participate fully in Satan's work upon humanity, to imply a growth in spiritual knowledge and personal power. In standard devotional rituals, their orientation is described as a shift from control to attachment and self-development, in which their rituals are not intended to forcibly summon demons but instead enable mystical experiences and empowerment more in tune with their expressive concerns. The central part of their "Standard Ritual to Satan" consists in reading prayers to and "communicating with father Satan one to one", which is considered by Jesper Petersen "a surprising break with the more traditional ceremonial activities known in mainstream satanic culture." The structure of the ritual is also considered fairly standard, after which suitable preparations (bathing, lighting candles and so on), the ritual begins with ringing the bell and invoking "The four princes of hell." In the main part, the Invocation to Satan is recited, establishing a link suitable for prayer and communication. The practitioner, after concluding his endeavors, will then end the ritual with a close.

Prominent theistic Satanist, Diane Vera, commends the owner of the Joy of Satan site, Maxine Dietrich, stating her pioneering efforts is a vast improvement over the old, disrespectful grimoire methods. Rev. Jeff Rhoades also states their endeavors with demons are "with much more respect than most version of the Goetia and other Christian grimoires."

Adherents of the Joy of Satan may also partake in rituals against those believed to be "enemies of Satan", a notion advocated as spiritual warfare.

Reception
Joy of Satan Ministries became the topic of significant criticism for its close connections to a high-ranking leader of the National Socialist Movement, as well as for its anti-Judaic, anti-Christian, and anti-Semitic beliefs. While spiritual Satanists have adopted their ideas as a model, they have since distanced themselves from the group's controversial beliefs and "very explicit connection with Nazism."

When the fact that Maxine was the wife of a well-known American neo-Nazi leader became public knowledge, it created serious problems within Joy of Satan itself. This controversy exposed the split in the NSM between the Christian Identity and the Odinists and Satanists. According to Introvigne (2016), "Several local groups abandoned Dietrich and started minuscule splinter organizations. Some of these insisted that they were not Satanist, just pagan". Introvigne adds that "most are by now defunct, while Joy of Satan continues its existence, although with a reduced number of members". Despite the events, Introvigne states that "Its ideas on extraterrestrials, meditation, and telepathic contacts with demons became, however, popular in a larger milieu of non-LaVeyan "spiritual" or theistic" Satanism". Followed by a series of backlash, Clifford and Andrea Herrington were also accused of sexual misconduct with many other allegations against them, however, Introvigne claims the allegations "are difficult to evaluate". Maxine's Satanic affiliations, however, were enough to result in Clifford Herrington's departure from the National Socialist Movement. Clifford Herrington would then form the "National Socialist Freedom Movement" after leaving the NSM in 2006.

Like the Order of Nine Angles, the Joy of Satan shares similar anti-Semitic beliefs and National Socialist sympathy and is considered to be in the same ideological category, appearing to be similar ideologies with some dissent to each other.

James R. Lewis noted in his "Satan census"(2009) a surprising number of respondents to the Joy of Satan. According to the scholar of Religious studies and researcher of New religious movements Jesper Aagaard Petersen's survey (2014) on the Satanic milieu's proliferation on the internet (2014) noted a surprising prominence among theistic Satanist websites on the internet, he states "the only sites with some popularity are the Church of Satan and (somewhat paradoxically) Joy of Satan's page base on the angelfire network, and they are still very far from Scientology or YouTube. Most of these sites are decidedly fringe."

See also
 Ancient Egyptian religion
 Ancient Mesopotamian religion
 Demonology
 Esoteric Nazism
 Extraterrestrial hypothesis
 Far-right politics
 Meditation
 Modern Paganism
 Occultism in Nazism
 Religions of the ancient Near East
 Spirituality

References

Bibliography

Further reading

External links 
 
Internet properties established in 2002
Left-Hand Path
Magical organizations
New religious movements
Religious organizations established in 2002
Satanism and Nazism
Satanism
UFO religions